Fistful of Dirt is a 2018 American drama film, directed by Sebastián Silva, from a screenplay by Silva and Pedro Peirano. It stars Julio Gastón Ramos, Dolores Pedro and Modesto Lacen.

It had its world premiere at the Telluride Film Festival on August 31, 2018.

Cast
 Julio Gastón Ramos as Yei
 Dolores Pedro as Wanda
 Modesto Lacen as Yei

Release
It had its world premiere at the Telluride Film Festival on August 31, 2018.

References

External links
 

2018 films
American drama films
American independent films
Films shot in Puerto Rico
2010s English-language films
2010s American films